MEGA Cosmos is a Canadian exempt Category B Greek language specialty channel owned by Odyssey Television Network.

MEGA Cosmos broadcasts programming primarily from the library of the homonymous pan-hellenic channel. Programming includes news, television dramas, game shows and more.

History
On 12 August 2011, Greek National Television Network (Canada) Inc., a subsidiary of Odyssey Television Network, was granted approval from the Canadian Radio-television and Telecommunications Commission (CRTC) to launch a television channel called OTN 3, described as "a national, general interest, third-language, ethnic speciality Category B service devoted to the Greek-speaking community in Canada."

Previous to OTN 3 launching, the MEGA Cosmos brand existed in Canada from 2007 to June 2012 through Ethnic Channels Group, who owned the channel and licensed its name and programming from MEGA Cosmos' parent owners in Greece. In June 2012, the channel was shut down.

In June 2012, Odyssey Television Network acquired the channel rights and subsequently launched its own version on 28 June 2012 using the OTN 3 licence. Odyssey Television Network owned much of the rights to MEGA Cosmos in Canada from 2001 to 2003, when it aired on the then-named Odyssey II channel. Programming was lost in 2003, subsequently, the channel was then renamed ERT Sat (now known as ERT World) as Odyssey reached an agreement with the parent Greek public broadcaster.

On September 14, 2018, the CRTC approved Odyssey Television Network's request to convert MEGA Cosmos (OTN3) from a licensed Category B speciality service to an exempted third language service.

In October 2022, MEGA Cosmos re-launched in Canada, available via Bell Satellite TV, Bell Fibe TV and Rogers Cable.

Notable shows
A list of notable shows that air on MEGA Cosmos, as of October 2022:
MEGA News – nightly newscast
Koinonia Ora Mega – morning show, airs Monday – Friday
Mega Kalimera – infotainment show, airs Monday – Friday
I Gi Tis Elias – drama, airs Monday - Friday
Mayro Rodo – drama, airs Saturday & Sunday
Eleni – lifestyle / talk show, airs weekday afternoons

References

External links
MEGA Cosmos Canada 
MEGA Cosmos 

Digital cable television networks in Canada
Multicultural and ethnic television in Canada
Television channels and stations established in 2012
Greek-Canadian culture
Greek-language television stations
Canada–Greece relations